The 1997 Island Games on the island of Jersey was the 5th edition in which a men's football (soccer) tournament was played at the multi-games competition. It was contested by 9 teams.

Jersey won the tournament for the second time.

Participants

Group phase

Group A

Group B

Placement play-off matches

7th place match

5th place match

3rd place match

Final

Final rankings

Top goalscorers

6 goals
  Eifion Williams

5 goals
  Adam Greig
  Dennis Lopez

4 goals
  Aaron Lima

3 goals
 Karl Måsøval

External links
Official 1997 website

1997
Gibraltar in international football
1996–97 in European football
1997 in Jersey
Football in Jersey